Columbia School District or variation, may refer to:

 Columbia Elementary School District, Reading, California, USA
 Columbia Union School District, Tuolumne County, California, USA
 Columbia County School District, Lake City, County of Columbia, Florida, USA
 Columbia School District (Mississippi), USA
 Columbia Public Schools, Columbia, Boone County, Missouri, USA
 Columbia Borough School District, Borough of Columbia, Lancaster County, Pennsylvania, USA
 Columbia-Brazoria Independent School District, West Columbia, Texas, USA
 District of Columbia Public Schools, school district of Washington, DC, USA
 School District 20 Kootenay-Columbia, British Columbia, Canada

See also
 District of Columbia (disambiguation) and Columbia District
 Columbia (disambiguation)